Mileage Plan is the frequent-flyer program of Alaska Airlines. Members accrue program "miles" by flying Alaska Airlines and partner-operated flights, using co-branded credit cards, and booking vacation and hotel packages, among other methods. Mileage Plan miles can be redeemed for award flights on Alaska Airlines and partner carriers and provide eligibility for elite status with Mileage Plan.

History
In June 1983, Alaska Airlines introduced their frequent-flyer program, Gold Coast Travel. In 1987, Alaska Airlines acquired Jet America Airlines, which offered a frequent-flyer program that awarded credit by flight segments (number of flights taken), compared to Gold Coast Travel, where members earned credit based on the mileage of flights taken. After acquisition by Alaska Airlines, participants of Jet America's frequent-flyer program were enrolled in Gold Coast Travel, and in September 1989, Gold Coast Travel was renamed Mileage Plan. Alaska Airlines also purchased regional commuter airline Horizon Air in 1986 and incorporated the carrier into Mileage Plan.

In 2016, Alaska Airlines acquired Virgin America, which offered a revenue-based accrual program, Elevate. On January 1, 2018, Elevate was discontinued, with all remaining accounts converted to Mileage Plan accounts.

Oneworld Membership
In February 2020, Alaska Airlines announced its intention to join the Oneworld airline alliance in the summer of 2021. This would add seven new airline partners, including Iberia, Malaysia Airlines, Qatar Airways, Royal Air Maroc, Royal Jordanian, S7 Airlines, and SriLankan Airlines.

In October 2020, Alaska announced its Oneworld membership date had been moved to March 21, 2021.

In December 2020, Oneworld member Qatar Airways established a mileage partnership with Alaska prior to the commencement of nonstop service from Seattle to Doha.

On March 31, 2021, Alaska Airlines officially joined the Oneworld alliance. Alaska temporarily suspended its partnership with S7 Airlines on March 1, 2022 in response to the 2022 Russian invasion of Ukraine.

Alaska Airlines flights, including Horizon Air flights, have been bookable as part of Oneworld Global Explorer fares since 2008.

Accrual Structure
On all scheduled Alaska Airlines flights, including flights operated by Horizon Air and SkyWest, members accrue one mile per mile flown. On flights under 500 miles, a minimum of 500 miles are awarded. Miles can also be accrued by flying eligible flights on Alaska Global Partners.

Beginning in 2015, most airlines in the United States switched to revenue-based accrual programs, where credit is awarded based on the fare paid. Alaska Airlines has previously indicated that retaining a distance-based accrual program is a competitive advantage over other carriers. Among major carriers in the United States, only Frontier Airlines and Hawaiian Airlines also accrue one mile per mile flown. No other major airline offers a minimum accrual amount (e.g. 500 miles) for passengers lacking elite status.

Partner Airlines
Mileage Plan includes 23 partner airlines that comprise the Alaska Global Partners. Partner airlines include Oneworld, SkyTeam, and Star Alliance members, as well as unaffiliated airlines.

The airline partners of Mileage Plan are:

Alaska Airlines was a former partner with regional carrier Kenmore Air beginning in 2010.

Delta had been a mileage partner from 2004 until 2017, when it established Seattle as a hub city. The partnership with Delta was preceded by a partnership with Northwest Airlines in 1995, prior to the merger of the two airlines. Alaska Airlines was also a former mileage partner with other SkyTeam members, including Aeromexico, from 2013 until 2017, and Air France and KLM, from 2007 until 2018.

Emirates ceased to be a partner in 2021, shortly after Alaska joined the Oneworld alliance. The two airlines had a mileage agreement starting in 2012.

Membership Tiers
Mileage Plan's elite tiers for frequent travelers are MVP, MVP Gold and MVP Gold 75K. Members in elite tiers receive additional benefits compared to non-elite members, including complimentary upgrades to First and Premium Class, increased mileage accrual, priority check-in and boarding, discount or free lounge access, complimentary checked bags and other benefits.

Members may attain elite status through one of the following methods:

Notes
  Includes Alaska Airlines and Horizon Air
  Both methods require flying a minimum number of segments on Alaska or Horizon Air (two for MVP; 6 for MVP Gold; 12 for MVP Gold 75K; 25 for MVP Gold 100K)

There is no minimum spending requirement in order to receive elite status in Mileage Plan. Additionally, Members who fly 1,000,000 miles on Alaska Airlines are granted MVP Gold status for life.

Additional Benefits
Mileage Plan members are permitted to check in one case of wine (up to 12 bottles) for free when flying domestically, if departing from one of 32 airports in California, Idaho, Oregon, or Washington.

In March 2016, Alaska Airlines introduced a promotional award where Mileage Plus members could redeem 10,000 miles to cover the $85 cost of a TSA PreCheck screening application charged by the Transportation Security Administration.

Club 49
Members who are residents of the State of Alaska, or military personnel permanently stationed in Alaska are eligible to participate in Alaska Airlines' Club 49 program.
Benefits include:
 Two complimentary checked bags on flights to or from Alaska, for participants and all passengers traveling on the same reservation
 Two Travel Now annual discounts for 30% off refundable one-way coach fares to, from, or within Alaska on Alaska Airlines, when booked within four days of departure
 Access to constituent fare rates, at a 30% discount, for Alaskans to access the state legislature and state agencies in Juneau
 Weekly fare sales via email for destinations within and outside Alaska
 The Freight For Less program, allowing participants to ship up to 100 pounds of freight within Alaska through Alaska Air Cargo for $10 (when flying) or $40 (all other times).

Recognition
As of 2022, Mileage Plan has been the recipient of the U.S. News & World Report Best Airline Reward Program for seven consecutive years since 2015, based on an airline's overall evaluation of six criteria: ease of earning a free round-trip flight, benefits, network coverage, flight volume, award flight availability and airline quality ratings.

References

Frequent flyer programs